Ernesto Cordero may refer to:

Ernesto Cordero (musician) (born 1946), Puerto Rican composer and guitarist
Ernesto Cordero Arroyo (born 1968), Mexican politician